BINA Istra is a Croatian joint stock company founded in 1995 to facilitate construction and subsequent management of an Istrian Y motorway, consisting of the A8 motorway and the A9 motorway. On September 21, 1995, BINA Istra has been granted concession regarding management of the Istrian Y. The concession agreement is valid until 2041, when the motorways shall be returned to the Republic of Croatia without any compensation.

The company currently manages or develops the following routes:

Current ownership structure of the company is as follows:

 BINA Fincom (67%)
 Bouygues (16%)
 Hrvatske autoceste (14.8%)
 Istarska autocesta (2.2%)

BINA Fincom d.d., the majority shareholder in the company has the following ownership structure:

 Bouygues (45%)
 Hrvatske autoceste (44%)
 INA - Industrija Nafte (5%)
 Antin Infrastructure Partners (6%)

The company is currently managed by Dario Silić (general manager) as well as a supervisory board chaired by Francois Jean Paul Tcheng.

See also 
 Highways in Croatia
 Hrvatske ceste

References

External links 
 

Transport companies of Croatia
Transport companies established in 1995
Croatian companies established in 1995